Samuel Dana Bell (October 9, 1798 – July 31, 1868), was the chief justice of the New Hampshire Superior Court of Judicature from September 30, 1859 to August 1, 1864.

Bell was a member of the New Hampshire House of Representatives in 1825.

From 1849 to 1859 Bell was an associate justice of the Superior Court of Judicature.

Bell was born in Francestown, New Hampshire on October 9, 1798. He was the eldest son to Samuel Bell, governor of New Hampshire and United States Senator, and Mehitable Bowen Dana, and graduated from Harvard University in 1816. 
 
Bell died in Manchester, New Hampshire on July 31, 1868.

References

1798 births
1868 deaths
People from Francestown, New Hampshire
Chief Justices of the New Hampshire Supreme Court
Members of the New Hampshire House of Representatives
New Hampshire lawyers
Harvard University alumni
19th-century American judges
19th-century American lawyers
19th-century American politicians